Kut-e Seyyed Enayat (also Romanized as Kūt-e Seyyed ‘Enāyat; also known as Anaīyeh, Kūt-e Seyyed ‘Enāyah, Kūt Saiyid ‘Anaīyeh, and Seyyed ‘Enāyat) is a village in Veys Rural District, Veys District, Bavi County, Khuzestan Province, Iran. At the 2006 census, its population was 591, in 102 families.

References 

Populated places in Bavi County